Pablo Moreno (born 19 August 1963) is a Spanish former racing cyclist. He rode in the 1990 Tour de France, the 1992 Giro d'Italia and four editions of the Vuelta a España.

References

External links
 

1963 births
Living people
Spanish male cyclists
People from Arganda del Rey
Cyclists from the Community of Madrid